Baystate Health is a not-for-profit integrated health system headquartered in Springfield, Massachusetts, serving Western Massachusetts and the Knowledge Corridor Region of Massachusetts and Connecticut. The system has 5 hospitals, over 80 medical practices, and 25 reference laboratories. With 12,000 employees including 1,600 physicians, it is one of Massachusetts' largest employers. Baystate also owns the for-profit insurer Health New England.

History

1974–1983
In 1974, Springfield Hospital Medical Center merged Wesson Women's Hospital to create the 672-bed Medical Center of Western Massachusetts. In 1976, the Medical Center of Western Massachusetts merged with Wesson Memorial Hospital. The merger established Baystate Medical Center, then the second-largest hospital in New England, with 1,036 beds.

In 1983, Baystate Medical Center was reorganized into three separate corporations: Baystate Health Systems, the parent corporation now renamed Baystate Health; Baystate Medical Center; and the for-profit corporation Baystate Diversified Health Services. The reorganization provided a legal framework for developing a future multi-institutional health care system and for reducing the assets that would be encumbered with the financing of a major new hospital building.

1986–2004
In 1986, Franklin Medical Center in Greenfield joined Baystate Health; in 1999, Baystate Mary Lane Hospital in Ware joined the health system. In 2004, the Visiting Nurse Association & Hospice of Pioneer Valley, now renamed the Baystate Visiting Nurse Association & Hospice, became a member of Baystate Health.

To this end, a major corporate restructuring in 1997 reduced the number of governing boards across BH from twenty-one to six. On January 1, 2004, the governance structure of Baystate Health was further simplified with the establishment of a single board of trustees for Baystate Health that also serves as mirror boards for its patient care entities that had previously been governed by a separate board.

2005–present
In August 2016, a phishing scam of Baystate Health employees may have compromised some demographic and clinical information of as many as 13,000 patients. Baystate informed patients and stated social security numbers or financial or account information was not accessed in the scam.

Components

Baystate Children's Hospital
Located on the campus of Baystate Medical Center in Springfield, Massachusetts, Baystate Children's Hospital, with 110 beds and 57 bassinets, provides complete critical care programs, including the region's only Pediatric Intensive Care and Neonatal Intensive Care Units. It also includes pediatric inpatient services, child life specialists, an emergency room for kids, and outpatient specialty services.

Baystate Franklin Medical Center 
Baystate Franklin Medical Center is a hospital in Greenfield, Massachusetts.

History 
In 1894, Dr. William Pierce and Ellen Brown rented a house at 6 Main Street and opened a private medical practice. The following year, citizens of Franklin County agreed to open Franklin County Public Hospital (FCPH). With $16,000 in community fundraising, the new hospital opened on September 9, 1895. In 1910, the hospital had raised an additional $65,000 in donations, enough to build a much larger facility on High Street.   Although FCPH struggled financially during the Great Depression, it managed to expand its facilities and recruit new medical specialists. The hospital expanded further after World War II, and became affiliated with Baystate Medical Center in 1981. To reflect this new affiliation, it was renamed Baystate Franklin Medical Center (BMFC) two years later.

Current facilities and operations 
Baystate Franklin Medical Center is a 90-bed hospital providing medical, surgical, obstetric, pediatric, psychiatric and behavioral health inpatient care, as well as outpatient services.  With 900 employees, it is the only hospital in Franklin County and serves rural communities with appropriate specialized services.

Baystate Mary Lane Outpatient Center
Baystate Mary Lane Outpatient Center in Ware, Massachusetts, is a 31-bed, tax-exempt, not-for-profit hospital, providing medical, surgical, pediatric, obstetric, emergency, outpatient, and adult day care services. Founded in 1909 by the Ware Visiting Nurse Association, the hospital services communities in Western and Central Massachusetts. The hospital was renamed Baystate Mary Lane Hospital in 2006.

In 2016, it was announced they will stop overnight care at the hospital. On June 3, 2021 Baystate Health permanently closed the emergency department.

Baystate Medical
Baystate Medical Center (BMC) is a hospital in Springfield, Massachusetts.

History 

In 1868,  Dr. George Stebbins, the city physician in Springfield, Massachusetts, recommended that the city establish a permanent hospital. The need for a dedicated hospital in Springfield became evident during and after the Civil War, when wounded soldiers came to the city in search of treatment. The city approved Dr. Stebbins' recommendation, and Springfield City Hospital opened two years later in a remodeled farmhouse on Boston Road. In 1886, Dorcas Chapin, the widow of Chester W. Chapin, bequeathed $25,000 of her husband's will to Springfield Hospital on the condition that an equal sum be raised. By 1907, the hospital had a main building surrounding by four wings.

In the twentieth century, Springfield's population increased considerably, and Springfield Hospital further expanded Expansion culminated in a big merger in fall 1976, when Springfield Hospital and Wesson Women's Hospital joined with Wesson Memorial to form the 1,036-bed Baystate Medical Center (BMC). Today, BMC is the largest hospital affiliated with Baystate Health Systems.

The new building also includes shell space for future growth. It  was officially dedicated on February 28, 2012. The Massachusetts Department of Health certified the new building in January 2012 and new patients began to occupy the building in March 2012.

Current facilities and operations 

Baystate Medical Center is currently a tax-exempt, nonprofit hospital with 716 beds and more than 4,000 employees. BMC serves as the tertiary care referral center for the region, meaning that it has a full complement of medical services and facilities. The latter include the area's only neonatal intensive care unit, a level-1 trauma center with pediatric designation, an adult cardiac surgery service with the region's only open-heart surgery capabilities, and a kidney transplant center. BMC is affiliated with the University of Massachusetts Medical School, and therefore is classified as an academic hospital. In 2016,  U.S. News & World Report ranked BMC the third-best hospital in Massachusetts. In March 2020, BMC constructed a triage area outside the emergency department to address the potential surge in COVID-19 patients.

Baystate Noble Hospital
Baystate Noble Hospital is a medical center in Westfield, Massachusetts.

History 

Founded in 1893, Noble Hospital owes its existence to Reuben Noble. Noble was born in Westfield in 1820. He made a fortune from the city's whip manufacturing industry and unsuccessfully campaigned as a Democrat in two Massachusetts State Senate elections. Noble died on June 3, 1890. His will gifted over $43,000 for the establishment of a hospital "for the reception of persons who may need medical or surgical treatment during temporary sickness or injury." Noble Hospital addressed the demand for a dedicated medical facility in Westfield, which was industrializing rapidly at the turn of the century.

By 1905, Noble Hospital had expanded to include a surgical center and a nurse's training school. Between 1917 and 1920, the hospital's medical staff treated hundreds of wounded World War I veterans and Spanish Influenza patients. It grew further in the interwar period and treated airmen from Westfield's Barnes Airport during World War II. In 1956, its trustees voted to construct a new hospital building. Westfield residents enthusiastically supported this decision, raising $1,500,000 to fund the construction of this new facility. The new Noble Hospital opened in 1958, and has expanded its services substantially over the past half century.

Current facilities and operations 
In 2015, Noble Hospital joined Baystate Health and became Baystate Noble Hospital. The 97-bed facility now has an emergency center, a psychiatric ward, and an ICU. Services include intensive care, diagnostic imaging, cardiopulmonary services and rehab, emergency treatment, cancer services, lab and behavioral health. In 2015, the Cleverley & Associates Community Value Index recognized Noble Hospital as being in the top 20 percent of hospitals nationwide. In 2019 both the Telemetry Unit and the Intensive Care Unit of Noble Hospital were closed.

Baystate Wing Hospital 
Baystate Wing Hospital in Palmer, Massachusetts is a 74-bed community hospital with a  history of providing  health care for  the Quaboag Hills and the Pioneer Valley. In addition, Baystate Wing's five medical centers, located in Belchertown, Ludlow, Monson, Palmer, and Wilbraham, offer  outpatient services and primary care.

External links 
 Baystate Health Website
 Annual Report

References

Hospital networks in the United States
Hospitals in Hampden County, Massachusetts
Healthcare in Massachusetts
Organizations based in Springfield, Massachusetts
Non-profit organizations based in Massachusetts
Hospitals established in 1883
1883 establishments in Massachusetts
Medical and health organizations based in Massachusetts
Trauma centers